The Capitol Park and Lagoon is a provincial park located in  Bacolod, Negros Occidental, in the Philippines.  One of the features of the park are matching sculptures depicting a woman standing alongside a water buffalo and that of a man pulling another water buffalo. These sculptures are located at the northern and southern ends of the lagoon. These figures were executed by Italian sculpture Francesco Riccardo Monti who also did  the sculptures of the Metropolitan Manila Theater and the University of the Philippines - Visayas Iloilo campus. Guillermo Tolentino also contributed as a sculptor of the figures.

Attractions and landmarks

Popular activities at the park include jogging, aerobics, school dance rehearsals, promenading, Arnis and martial arts practice and feeding the tilapias of the lagoon.

The main landmark in the park is the Negros Occidental Provincial Capitol building. It is the official seat of the Governor of the province. Different government offices of the province serving its thirteen cities and municipalities are also located in the vicinity of the park.

The first Panaad sa Negros Festival, also known as the Panaad Festival, was held  here in a three-day affair in 1993 that began April 30. The festival was held at the Capitol Park and Lagoon fronting the Provincial Capitol for the first four years.  As the festival grew each year, it became necessary to look for a more spacious venue.  In 1997, the festival was held at the reclaimed area near  the Bredco Port. The construction of the Panaad Stadium and sports complex paved the way for the establishment of the Panaad Park as the permanent home of the festival.

The park today has become a popular spot for local families to hold picnics on Sundays and holidays and a major tourist attraction of Negros. A man-made lake or lagoon in the middle of the park contains live tilapia fish. The park has recreational value as well, as bands, orchestras and other forms of entertainment are provided for free in its open-air auditorium in events aptly called "Concert at the Park".

See also 
 Capitol Central
 Bacolod Public Plaza
 Fountain of Justice
 Rizal Park 
 Paco Park

References

External links
Official Website of the Provincial Government of Negros Occidental
Official Website of the City Government of Bacolod
Philippine Standard Geographic Code

Parks in the Philippines
Buildings and structures in Bacolod
Landmarks in the Philippines
Tourist attractions in Bacolod